The Dicle Bridge is a historic bridge in Diyarbakır  over the river Tigris in southeastern Turkey. Hence, it is locally called also "On Gözlü Köprü" / "Pira Dehderî" (literally: Ten Arches Bridge). Its another name is the Silvan Bridge due to its position being on the road to Silvan.

The bridge was commissioned by Nizam al-Din and Muyyid al-Dawla during the Kurdish dynasty, Marwanids era (990–1085) in Diyarbakır, and was built by architect Yusuf son of Ubeyd son of Sandjar in 1065, as stated in two lines of Kufic script in the inscription mounted on the southern facade of the bridge.

The bridge is situated south of the city,  outside of Mardinkapı/Deriyê Mêrdînê (literally: Mardin Gate). Its location is the nearest to the city considered the bends and the course of the river as well as the rate of water flow. Longest span of the ten arches measures .

Due to its historic characteristic, motorized traffic over the bridge suspended after the construction of the Marwanids Bridge, or as initially named Bağıvar Bridge, in November 2009.

References

Buildings and structures completed in 1065
Bridges completed in the 11th century
Road bridges in Turkey
Deck arch bridges
Bridges in Diyarbakır
Bridges over the Tigris River
Stone bridges in Turkey
Pedestrian bridges in Turkey
Kurdish culture
Arch bridges in Turkey